Bartomeu Càrceres (Valencian pronunciation: [bəɾtuˈmɛu ˈkaɾsəɾəs]), Bartolomé Cárceres in castillian, (fl. 1546) was a Spanish composer, notably of ensaladas.

Biography  
The sole verifiable biographical fact known about him is the record in 1546 of a payment of 72 ducats to him as "carrier of the books" to the capella of the Duke of Calabria, Fernando de Aragón. His salary was half that of the maestro de capilla, Juan de Cepa.
Manuscript M1166-M1967 of the Biblioteca de Catalunya includes works by both Càrceres and Cepa. For example, the villancico Soleta y verge, an adaptation of a secular song from the Cancionero de Upsala appears in a version for three voices by Càrceres and a variation developed from this for five voices with refrain by Cepa.

Works 
 
Sacred works
 Missa de desponsatione beatae Mariae
 Elegit sibi Dominus
 Vias tuas, Domine
 Lamentation Lamech - O vos omnes

Secular works
 Al jorn del judici
 Soleta yo so / Soleta y verge
 Falalalanlera
 Toca Juan tu rabelejo
 Remedio del primer padre
 Nunca tal cosa se vio
 ensalada: La trulla ("Hubbub")

Recordings 
 Bartomeu Càrceres - Villancicos & Ensaladas. Jordi Savall
 Bartomeu Càrceres - Ensaladas. Capella de Ministrers, 2011

References 

Composers from Catalonia
Renaissance composers
16th-century Spanish people
16th-century composers
Spanish male classical composers
Spanish classical composers